Death in Paradise may refer to the following:

Death in Paradise (novel), a 2001 novel by Robert B. Parker
Jesse Stone: Death in Paradise, a 2006 TV film based on the novel
Death in Paradise (TV series), a British-French crime drama set on the fictional Caribbean island of Saint-Marie 
A series of novels, written by the show's creator Robert Thorogood and based on the show; see 
"Death in Paradise", the 1997 pilot episode of New Zealand crime drama series Duggan